Muhammad Ali Durrani is a Pakistani politician and former federal minister who had been member of the Senate of Pakistan from 2003 to 2012.

Political career
He started his political career by joining Islami Jamiat Talaba Pakistan. He became the Nazim of KPK (Formerly NWFP) and Punjab. After which he joined Pasban Pakistan.
He later joined Millat Party. In Musharraf government, Millat Party merged with Pakistan Muslim League (Q) (PML-Q).

He was elected to the Senate of Pakistan as a candidate of PML-Q and was placed at several key positions including Chairman Standing Committee of Commerce, Special Advisor to Prime Minister of Pakistan, Minister for State for Sports, Culture and Youth Affairs, Chairman National Volunteer Movement and Federal Minister Information and Broadcasting. He remained member of the Senate of Pakistan from 2003 to 2012. In 2013, he joined Pakistan Muslim League (F) and currently serving as its secretary general.

References

Living people
Pakistan Muslim League (Q) politicians
Pakistan Muslim League (F) politicians
Members of the Senate of Pakistan
Federal ministers of Pakistan
Year of birth missing (living people)